Tajpur (officially known as Tiwaripur) in nebourhood in Dildarnagar of Dildarnagar Kamsar in Ghazipur district of Uttar Pradesh, India.

Tiwaripur

References 

Dildarnagar
Dildarnagar Fatehpur
Cities and towns in Ghazipur district
Towns and villages in Kamsar